Samuel Black (1780–1840) was a Canadian fur trader and explorer.

Samuel or Sam Black may also refer to:
Samuel Black (Assemblyman) (1827–1916), Republican politician from the U. S. State of Wisconsin
Samuel Charles Black (1869–1921), fifth president of Washington & Jefferson College
Samuel W. Black (1816–1862), Governor of the Nebraska Territory
Samuel Luccock Black (1859–1929), Democratic politician from the U. S. State of Ohio
Sam Black (artist) (1913–1997), British-Canadian artist
Sam Black (cricketer) (born 1947), cricketer for Middlesex
Sam Black (public relations) (1915–1999), British public relations professor
Sam Black (singer) (born 1990), contestant on series fourteen of The X Factor
Sammy Black (1905–1977), Scottish footballer who played for Plymouth Argyle
Reverend Sam Black (1813–1899), influential Methodist Circuit Rider from the U. S. State of West Virginia

See also
Sammy Turner (Samuel Black, born 1932), American singer